Claude Frank (born Claus Johannes Frank; December 24, 1925 – December 27, 2014) was a German-born American pianist.

Biography 
Of Jewish ancestry, Frank was born in Nuremberg, Germany.  His father emigrated to Brussels after the advent of the Third Reich, and the family eventually settled in Paris when Frank was 12.  Frank subsequently began studies at the Paris Conservatoire, but in 1940, he and his mother escaped France by way of the Pyrenees and Lisbon, and settled in the USA.  Frank studied with Artur Schnabel in New York, for whom he first played in Europe.  He also was a pupil of Maria Curcio.  He studied composition and conducting at Columbia University, where his teachers included Paul Dessau.  At Tanglewood, he studied with Serge Koussevitzky.  He became an American citizen in 1944 and served in the US military, which interrupted his piano studies.

Frank was a member of the Boston Symphony Chamber Players.  He served on the faculty of the Curtis Institute of Music, and presented master classes at Yale University, Duke University, the University of Kansas, and the North Carolina School of the Arts among many others. He joined the piano faculty of the Yale School of Music in 1973.  Frank wrote his memoirs with co-author Hawley Roddick, The Music That Saved My Life: From Hitler's Germany to the World's Concert Stages.  As part of the cultural events surrounding the 2008 Beijing Olympics, Frank performed alongside nine other celebrated pianists at "The Olympic Centenary Piano Extravaganza of China".

Frank often gave joint concerts with his wife, pianist Lilian Kallir (1931–2004), whom he had met in 1947 at Tanglewood.  The couple married in 1959 in Marlboro, Vermont, and the marriage lasted until Kallir's death.  The couple had a daughter, the violinist Pamela Frank (born 1967), with whom Frank also appeared in recital, and who survives her father.  The father-daughter team recorded the complete sonatas for violin and piano of Beethoven commercially.  Other commercial recordings by Frank included a complete set of the 32 Beethoven piano sonatas, issued on the RCA Victrola label in the Beethoven bicentenary year of 1970, in parallel with a series of live concerts of the complete Beethoven sonatas.

Frank died on December 27, 2014, three days after his 89th birthday.

References

External links
 Biography of Claude Frank from Saint Paul Sunday radio program

1925 births
2014 deaths
20th-century American male musicians
20th-century American pianists
20th-century German male classical pianists
21st-century American male musicians
21st-century American pianists
21st-century German male classical pianists
American classical pianists
American male classical pianists
American people of German-Jewish descent
Duke University faculty
Jewish classical pianists
Jewish emigrants from Nazi Germany to the United States
Music & Arts artists
Piano pedagogues
Pupils of Maria Curcio
Yale School of Music faculty